Mardon is a surname. Notable people with the surname include:

 Austin Mardon
 Ernest George Mardon
 Geoff Mardon
 Paul Mardon

Fictional characters
 Mark Mardon, the real name of Weather Wizard
 Clyde Mardon, the brother of Mark

See also
 Marden